Gomora is a South African television drama series produced by Seriti Films. The series is filmed in the Alexandra township, hence the name of the series. Gomora is a story about inequality. It's about the rich and the poor, how fine the line between the two can be. It is an M-Net original production commissioned for M-Net's local interest channel Mzansi Magic. The drama series replaced Isthembiso, which had not been renewed for a fourth season. The series tells a story of two families in two different lifestyles and how their lives intertwine by a tragedy. .

Gomora season 3 stars Katlego Danke, Thembi Seete, Connie Chiume, Ntobeko Sishi, Sannah Mchunu, Sicelo Bhuthelezi, Siphesihle Ndaba, Siyasanga Papu and Fezile Makhanya. Co starring Nandipha Khubone, Velile Makhoba, Lerato Mokoka, Leera Mthethwa, Ama Qamata, Khaya Mthembu, Thulani Mtshweni, Moshe Ndiki and Ntandazo Mndayi.It is noted by tv reporters that Siphesihle Ndaba who plays the character of Zanele MaZet Thwala was written off the storyline as it proceed to Season 4

Plot 
The series tells the story of two families, one of a man who has made his riches and success by illegal means from a bank he owns, the other of a man well-respected in the community who struggles to make ends meet. Their two worlds collide in a botched hijacking attempt which sets their lives into a serious downward spiral.

The series explores the themes of social economic issues, the disparity between the lower and upper-class members of South African society, the contrast between them being brought to life through particularly innovative filming styles.

Main Cast

Current Opening theme
As Shown on Opening theme
Season 3
Katlego Danke as Thathi Molefe - Ndaba 
Connie Chiume as NomaSonto Molefe
Thembi Seete as Gladys Dlamini 
Ntobeko Sishi as Ntokozo Dlamini
Sannah Mchunu as Zodwa Zondo 
Scelo Buthelezi as Teddy Zondo
Sphesihle Ndaba as Mazet Thwala
Siyasanga Papu as Pretty Molefe - Madida 
Fezile Makhanya as Nkosinathi Cele

Previous Opening Theme
Cast shown on previous seasons

Season 1
Katlego Danke as Thathi Molefe - Ndaba 
Zolisa Xaluva as Melusi Dlamini 
Connie Chiume as Sonto Molefe 
Thembi Seete as Gladys Dlamini 
Ntobeko Sishi as Ntokozo Dlamini 
Siphesihle Ndaba as Mazet 
Ama Qamata as Buhle Ndaba 
Siya Xaba as Langa Ndaba 
Siyasanga Papu as Pretty Molefe - Madida 
Scelo Buthelezi as Teddy Zondo 
Season 2
Katlego Danke as Thathi Molefe - Ndaba 
Zolisa Xaluva as Melusi Dlamini 
Connie Chiume as Sonto Molefe 
Thembi  Seete as Gladys Dlamini 
Sannah Mchunu as Zodwa Zondo 
Scelo Bhuthelezi as Teddy Zondo 
Ntobeko Sishi as Ntokozo Dlamini 
Sphesihle Ndaba as Mazet 
Israel Matseke-Zulu as Don Bhuthelezi

Cast 
The cast consists of a number of veterans in the South African acting industry, with a few new additions.

 Onthatile "Thathi" Molefe - Ndaba (Katlego Danke)

Mbongeni's trophy wife and Melusi's high school sweetheart. She has managed to escape her lowly, humble township roots and was living the highlife as a socialite in Sandton. She was married to CEO and major shareholder of CBS Bank, Mbongeni Ndaba (Themba Ndaba), who is found guilty of fraud. His death in a botched hijacking attempt brings her back into the Kasi lifestyle. She has a child caled Phodiso. She took a vacation out of Gomora to ensure that her baby is safe after MaZet and Zibuko attempted to murder her baby. (Main role: Season 1 - present)  

Melusi Dlamini  (Zolisa Xaluva) An upright, strict father. He had a previous relationship with Thathi and is now married to Gladys. He is a principal in a local high school. He expects his son to be an overachiever. He is looked upon by the community as a respected man, though his household can barely make ends meet. He is the patriarch of the Dlamini household. He dirvoced Gladys. He was arrested for killing Phumlani. (Main role: Season 1 - 2)

 Mam'Sonto Molefe (Connie Chiume)

Thathi's mother. She is the puppet master in the township who orchestrated the hijacking which ultimately led to her son-in-law 's death. She is the matriarch of the Molefe family. (Main role: Season 1 - present)

 Gladys Dlamini (Thembi Seete)

A street-smart and tough social worker who believes in uplifting the community. She mediates the conflict between father and son in their home. Gladys feels insecure about Melusi and Thati's relationship because Thathi is Melusi's high school sweetheart. She dirvoced Melusi. She is in a relationship with Nkosinathi. (Main role: Season 1 - present)

 Ntokozo Dlamini (Ntobeko Sishi)

The son of Gladys who seeks affection from his father Melusi, to no avail. Thus he joins a band of criminals and is involved in the botched hijacking, being responsible for pulling the trigger. His mood and habit changes, which becomes noticeable to his parents. He was in an unstable relationship with Buhle.(Main role: Season 1 - present)

 Buhle Ndaba (Ama Qamata)

Buhle is Thathi's spoilt daughter. She finds herself in the township on account of his father's missing payments on school fees and life insurance. She was previously in an unstable relationship with Ntokozo. Buhle has since left the show, saying she had to study with her best friend in Durban. She came back for Langa's funeral. She was killed by Qhoqhoqho at the taxi rank in season 3. (Main role: Season 1 - 2; Guest role: Season 3)

 Langa Dlamini (Siya Xaba)

Langa was Thathi and Melusi's son. The first born of the family who also turns out to be Principal Dlamini's son. Langa is the more level-headed child between him and Buhle. He was friends with Teddy and Ntokozo. He was killed by Gladys in a fire at Mam'Sonto's tavern. (Main role: Season 1, Recurring role: Season 2)

 Sibusiso "Teddy" Zondo (Sicelo Buthelezi)

Teddy is a teenager who has been adopted by Gladys and Melusi due to the fact that his mother (Zodwa) drinks a lot. Teddy was born with fetal alcohol syndrome, which causes him to be a slow learner. Teddy is friends with Ntokozo and Langa. As the show goes on,it shows that male rape exists as Teddy is raped by Gladys' friend Ms Manzi (a young and attractive teacher) and he undergoes severe psychological and social problems while dealing with it. He is currently dating Tshiamo. (Main role: Season 1 - present)

 Pretty Molefe - Madida (Siyasanga Papu)

Thathi's younger sister. She carries resentment towards her as she has been in her sister's shadow all her life. As the show progresses, Thati and Pretty are shown to have a better sibling relationship. Pretty is mother to Tshiamo and is Sbonga’s wife.(Main role: Season 1 - present)

 Zanele "MaZet" Thwala (Siphesihle Ndaba)

A female expert on hijacking cars trained by Mam'Sonto. She has lured Ntokozo into a life of crime and has a history with Ntokozo's dad.(Main role: Season 1 - present)

 Tshiamo Madida (Lerato Mokora)

She is the daughter of Pretty Molefe and Sbonga Madida who is also the son in-law of Mam' Sonto. Tshiamo had a difficult relationship with Langa and Buhle in the beginning, but they have all grown closer with Tshiamo being very close to Langa. She is currently in a relationship with Teddy. (Recurring role: Season 1, Main role: Season 2 - present)

Ntombizodwa "Zodwa" Zondo (Sannah Mchunu)

Zodwa is a recovering alcoholic and is Teddy’s mother. She was best friends with Gladys in High School. Due to her addiction to alcohol, Zodwa was taken to rehab and came back to work for Melusi and Gladys. She can be fierce at times, especially when she feels provoked by Gladys. She and Teddy have a very close relationship. As the show goes on, she dates Bongani.(Recurring role: Season 1, Main role: Season 2 - present)

 Sbonga Madida (Khaya Mthembu)

Sbonga is Pretty’s husband and Tshiamo’s father. He works at Sonto’s tavern and he is cohabiting with Pretty in Sonto’s house. This makes him subject to ridicule by community members. He dreams of taking Pretty and Tshiamo out of Gomora. (Recurring role: Season 1 - present)

 Jackie Hlungwani (Leera Mthethwa)

A no-nonsense teacher at Gomora High School that has a close working relationship with Melusi Dlamini. Jackie has been seen to be very intuitive when something seems to be wrong with her students.(Recurring role: Season 1 - present)

Impact of Covid-19 on production 
Just months after the show aired, Gomora was one of the first South African TV shows to be pulled from broadcasting after a production break due to  COVID-19 lockdown regulations in South Africa.

References 

M-Net original programming